The Schleicher ASK 14 is a West German low-wing, single-seat motor glider that was designed by Rudolf Kaiser and produced by Alexander Schleicher GmbH & Co.

The aircraft is often referred to as the Schleicher AS-K 14 or the Schleicher ASK-14, the AS for Alexander Schleicher and the K for Kaiser. The US Federal Aviation Administration designates the aircraft as the Schleicher ASK-14, while Transport Canada  and the United Kingdom Civil Aviation Authority call it the Schleicher ASK 14.

Design and development
The ASK 14 was developed as a low-wing motorized version of the Schleicher Ka 6E. The powerplant is a  Hirth F10 K19 four-cylinder, two-stroke engine, made by Hirth and driving a fully feathering propeller.

The aircraft is built from wood and covered with doped aircraft fabric covering. The  span wing employs a NACA 63-618 airfoil at the wing root transitioning to a NACA 63-615 section at the wing tip and features spoilers. The monowheel landing gear is retractable. The cockpit is covered by a bubble canopy that gives all-around visibility.

Due to its Ka 6E heritage the handling of the ASK 14 was described by Soaring Magazine in 1983 as "superb".

The ASK 14 was never type certified and aircraft registered in the United States were in the Experimental - Racing/Exhibition  category. ASK 14s in Canada are in the category CAR Standard 507.03(5)(a) Aircraft Held a Flight Permit - Private Aircraft prior 01/89. Those in the UK have an EASA Certificate of Airworthiness.

Operational history
ASK 14s finished second, third and fourth in the single-place class at the first international motorglider competition, that was held at Burg Feuerstein, West Germany in 1970.

In 1971 former Soaring Magazine editor Bennett Rogers set the first United States motorgliding record in an ASK 14, flying  out-and-return from Rosamond, California, US.

In July 2011 there were still eight ASK 14s registered with the FAA in the US, two with the UK Civil Aviation Authority and one registered with Transport Canada.

Specifications (ASK 14)

See also

References

External links

1960s German sailplanes
Schleicher aircraft
Single-engined tractor aircraft
Low-wing aircraft
Motor gliders
Aircraft first flown in 1967